Happy Go Lucky is a 2014 Punjabi film directed by Amarpreet GS Chhabra, story/screenplay by Amberdeep Singh and Rajan Agarwal and starring Amrinder Gill, Isha Rikhi, Harish Verma, Shruti Sodhi, Sumit Sandhu, Dakshita Kumaria and Shiwani Saini, Gurpreet Ghuggi as the main cast of the film. This film was released on 21 November 2014.

Cast
 Amrinder Gill as Harwinder Singh / Happy
 Isha Rikhi as Sirat
 Harish Verma as Goldy
 Shruti Sodhi as Jas
 Sumit Sandhu as Lucky
 Dakshita Kumaria as Mahek
Shiwani Saini as Preet
 Gurpreet Ghuggi as Harpal
 Kuldeep Sharma as Harnek Brar
 Tarsem Paul as Parminder Singh
 Sahdev Salaria as Gama
 Parminder Gill as Drug addict's mother

Plot
Happy Go Lucky is a story of three sisters who desire their life partners to be Inspector, Singer and a NRI. Coincidentally, when they speak of their desires, Bhalla who is the father of three sons stands by listening to them and thinking about his own sons who match all their desires. The girls' father initially is upset, and declines the match. But eventually the marriages take place.

References 

 http://www.cinepunjab.com/2014/01/happy-go-lucky.html
 http://www.punjabiportal.com/articles/happy-go-lucky-punjabi-movie

External links
 Happy Go Lucky Trailer

2014 films
Punjabi-language Indian films
2010s Punjabi-language films
Films scored by Jatinder Shah
Films scored by Jassi Katyal